Craugastor omoaensis is a species of frog in the family Craugastoridae.
It is endemic to Honduras and also is one of 13 species of amphibians and reptiles that are endemic to the Sierra de Omoa. It is known from only 24 specimens studied.
Its natural habitats are subtropical or tropical moist montane forests, rivers, and intermittent rivers.

Conservation Status
In a 2004 assessment, The International Union for the Conservation of Nature and Natural Resources (IUCN) categorised the frog as Critically Endangered on the Red List after meeting the criteria set out by the 1996 IUCN Red List of Threatened Animals. 
since 1996 there has been an almost complete disappearance of the frog; the causes being attributed to  habitat loss and chytridiomycosis. Its habit (as of 2004) measured 100km2 and it is possible the species is now extinct.

References

Sources
 
 IUCN, Conservation International, and NatureServe. 2006. Global Amphibian Assessment. <www.globalamphibians.org>. Accessed on 22 Jan 2008.
Baillie, J. and Groombridge, B. (eds). 1996. 1996 IUCN Red List of Threatened Animals.  IUCN, Gland, Switzerland.

omoaensis
Endemic fauna of Honduras
Amphibians of Honduras
Frogs of North America
Amphibian extinctions since 1500
Amphibians described in 1997
Taxonomy articles created by Polbot